

Eadwulf was a medieval Bishop of Elmham.

Eadwulf was consecrated before 955 and died sometime after 966.

References

External links

Bishops of Elmham